Dystrichothorax bipunctatus is a species of ground beetle in the subfamily Psydrinae. It was described by Blackburn in 1982.

References

bipunctatus
Beetles described in 1982